Eithel Ariel Rodríguez Araya (born 22 April 1986) is a Costa Rican international footballer who plays as a midfielder.

Career

Club
Rodríguez made his debut for Alajuelense in 2004 and joined Pérez Zeledón in 2010, only to return to Liga in 2013.

International
He made his international debut for Costa Rica in a January 2013 Copa Centroamericana match against Belize , and was called up to the provisional squad at the 2014 FIFA World Cup.

References

External links
 

1986 births
Living people
Costa Rican footballers
Costa Rica international footballers
Association football midfielders
L.D. Alajuelense footballers
Municipal Pérez Zeledón footballers
Copa Centroamericana-winning players
Liga FPD players
2013 Copa Centroamericana players
2013 CONCACAF Gold Cup players
2021 CONCACAF Gold Cup players